Iochroma longipes is a species of plant in the family Solanaceae. It is endemic to Ecuador.

References

longipes
Flora of Ecuador
Vulnerable plants
Taxonomy articles created by Polbot